A Queer History of the United States is a concise history of LGBT people in US society. It describes ways in which queer people have influenced the evolution of the United States, and how the culture of the United States has affected them.

A Queer History of the United States was published by Beacon Press in 2011. It was recognized with a Stonewall Book Award in 2012. The author, Michael Bronski, is a professor of Women's & Gender Studies at Dartmouth College, and professor of Practice in Media and Activism in Studies of Women, Gender, and Sexuality at Harvard University.

Chapters
 The Persecuting Society
 Sexually Ambiguous Revolutions
 Imagining a Queer America
 A Democracy of Death and Art
 A Dangerous Purity
 Life on the Stage, Life in the City
 Production and Marketing of Gender
 Sex in the Trenches
 Visible Communities, Invisible Lives
 Revolt, Backlash, Resistance

See also

 Gay American History: Lesbians and Gay Men in the U.S.A. (1976)
 Transgender History (2008)
 Real Queer America (2019)
 LGBT history in the United States
 History of the United States
 2011 in literature

References

Further reading
 
 
 

Books about LGBT history
Stonewall Book Award-winning works
2011 non-fiction books
2010s LGBT literature
American non-fiction books
History books about the United States
LGBT literature in the United States
Lambda Literary Award-winning works
Beacon Press books